Amsterdam is a census-designated place (CDP) in Gallatin County, Montana, United States. The population was 180 at the 2010 census. It is part of the Bozeman, MT Micropolitan Statistical Area. It was formerly part of the Amsterdam-Churchill CDP.

Geography
Amsterdam is located at  (45.738262, -111.339096).

History
Originally called Walrath for farmer A. J. Walrath, Amsterdam was established in 1911 by the Northern Pacific Railway on a branch line between Manhattan and Anceney. The railroad changed the name to Amsterdam because of the large number of Dutch settlers who had moved to the area in the 1890s to grow malting barley to supply the Manhattan Malting Company.

Demographics

References

External links
 Gallatin County Emergency Management

Census-designated places in Gallatin County, Montana
Census-designated places in Montana